The 1934–35 season was Port Vale's 29th season of football in the English Football League, and their fifth successive season (28th overall) in the Second Division. A positive start to the season raised hope of promotion; however, from October onwards the club performed so poorly as to finish fifth-from-bottom. One event of note was a six-week discussion over a possible change of name; the names Stoke Central, Stoke United, Stoke North End, and Hanley Port Vale were considered – however none of these names attracted enough support to institute a change.

Overview

Second Division
The pre-season saw the arrival of eight new signings, the most significant of these were: 'safe as houses' goalkeeper John Potts (Leeds United), 'outstanding' outside-right John Friar (Bournemouth & Boscombe Athletic), inside-left David Galloway (Preston North End), and centre-half Joe Craven (Swansea Town).

The season started with just one defeat in the opening eight games, leaving the club in fourth place by the end of September – mostly down to the goalscoring partnership of Friar and Nolan. Home victories over Sheffield United, Southampton, Manchester United, and Burnley nevertheless saw attendances of only 7,311 to 11,975. Following this they went on a run of twelve games without a win, with an over-reliance on Friar and Nolan in attack, whilst the defence lacked understanding. The team was changed around but to no avail, as they slipped down the league towards a relegation battle. In the middle of December Friar was sold on to Preston North End, having scored ten goals in eighteen games, with the 'more steady' Ted Critchley heading in the other direction. Their poor form was halted with a Christmas day victory over Bradford City. The team were then inconsistent until the end of the season.

The 2 February match programme (for a 2–1 victory over Swansea) recorded a discussion on whether or not the club should change its name. Coming to the conclusion that many people didn't know where Port Vale was, Stoke Central and Stoke United were put forward as possible new names. A discussion with the fans resulted, in which Stoke United was decided as the best alternative, despite calls from some for the name Hanley to be included. On 2 March (a 1–1 draw with Norwich City) each supporter was given a ballot slip upon entering The Old Recreation Ground, with the result of the poll being that 3,737 were in favour of a change of name, and 3,633 opposed a change. A shareholders' meeting on 18 March at the Grand Hotel (Hanley) saw the directors suggest the name of Stoke North End to the 100 members present. Finding little support, a resolution was instead passed for the new name of Hanley Port Vale. The Football League forced them to wait until the end of the season to implement a name change, having already printed countless papers with the original name. However the new name proved to be unpopular with the public, who criticized the club for being too parochial and 'lacking civic pride'. The change of name never took place.

Back on the pitch, the team were bobbing along, picking up enough points to avoid concerns over relegation – whereas Oldham Athletic and Notts County were rapidly drifting away from safety. On 9 March at St James' Park the Vale picked up a shock result by beating promotion hopefuls Newcastle United 2–1 – their first away win in 24 attempts, ending a run going back to January 1934. Nolan's stand-in James Baker bagged both of the goals. On 19 April a 5–3 beating of Notts County proved enough to all but guarantee safety, yet Vale still earned just two points from their final four games. On 20 April they lost a massive 8–0 to champions Brentford – the biggest defeat in the division that season.

They finished eighteenth with 34 points, eight points clear of relegation, and 22 points short of promotion. Away from home they recorded just the one win, whilst in front of goal their 55 goals scored was their lowest total since 1925 (after which the offside rule had been changed to make scoring easier). Tom Nolan's sixteen goals and the departed John Friar's ten goals were the only significant contributions.

Finances
On the financial side, a mere £11,120 was made on the gates, though a £3,775 credit on transfers ensured a profit of £2,415. Only fourteen players were retained, with those leaving including: James Baker (Barrow), Bob Morton (Throckley Welfare), Jack Blackwell (Boston United), Joe Craven (Newport County), David Galloway (Carlisle United), Ted Critchley (South Liverpool), and 128 game veteran Jack Round (also Carlisle).

Cup competitions
In the FA Cup, Vale were defeated 2–1 by eventual runners-up West Bromwich Albion of the First Division at The Hawthorns. The 18,989 crowd saw £1,000 raised in gate receipts, and a comeback from the "Throstles" just six minutes from time. This meant they exited at the Third Round for the third consecutive season.

League table

Results
Port Vale's score comes first

Football League Second Division

Results by matchday

Matches

FA Cup

Player statistics

Appearances

Top scorers

Transfers

Transfers in

Transfers out

References
Specific

General

Port Vale F.C. seasons
Port Vale